Lighter in the Dark is the ninth studio album by American rock group Sister Hazel. It is their first album release in nearly 6 years, and is their first album fully in a country style. The lead single is "We Got It All Tonight".

Track listing

Personnel
Ken Block - lead vocals, acoustic guitar
Jett Beres - bass, harmony vocals
Andrew Copeland - rhythm guitar, vocals
Ryan Newell - lead and slide guitar, harmony vocals
Mark Trojanowski - drums

Content
Band bassist Jett Beres was quoted as saying "The five years since our last record has been anything but a straight and clear path. After making records together for over 20 years, we found ourselves struggling to find The Sound; a body of work that would honestly represent who each of us were as a band and as individuals.  The music that was created was our 'lighter in the dark.'  The songs that form this record slowly began to illuminate a clarity of direction and creativity for us. In choosing a record title, this lyric from the song 'Something to Believe In' became the clear choice to represent our journey, our struggles, and ultimately our deliverance."

Charts

References 

2016 albums
Sister Hazel albums